The Constitution (Twenty-fifth Amendment) Act, 2017 was a proposed amendment to the Constitution of Pakistan which called for an increase in pension payments for the widows of judges. The amendment was approved by the standing committee of the National Assembly of Pakistan in February 2017. The bill was never adopted and never became part of Constitution of Pakistan as an amendment.

References

Amendments to the Constitution of Pakistan
2017 in Pakistani law